Natalia Soledad Melcon Prado (born December 17, 1990) is an Argentine actress.

Filmography

Television

Television Programs

Theater

Movies

Discography

Soundtrack albums 

 1999 —  Chiquititas Vol. 5
 2000 — Chiquititas Vol. 6
 2001 — Chiquititas Vol. 7
 2001 — Chiquititas: Rincón de Luz

See also
 Chiquititas
 Chiquititas soundtracks

External links 
 

Actresses from Buenos Aires
Argentine television actresses
Living people
1990 births